Hicks, Arkansas may refer to one of two locations in the U.S. state of Arkansas:

 Hicks, Phillips County, Arkansas
 Hicks, Washington County, Arkansas